Eugene Cook Bingham (8 December 1878 – 6 November 1945) was a professor and head of the department of chemistry at Lafayette College. Bingham made many contributions to rheology, a term he is credited (along with Markus Reiner) with introducing.  He was a pioneer in both its theory and practice.    The type of fluid known as a Bingham plastic or Bingham Fluid is named after him, as is Bingham Stress.      He was also one of the people responsible for the construction of the Appalachian Trail.

Biography
Bingham was born on 8 December 1878 in Cornwall, Vermont.

He was awarded the Franklin Institute's Certificate of Merit in 1921 for his variable pressure  viscometer. In 1922, as chairman of the Metric Committee of the American Chemical Society, he campaigned for the United States to adopt the metric system.

Bingham died on 6 November 1945 in Easton, Pennsylvania.

Legacy
The Society of Rheology has awarded the Bingham Medal annually since 1948.

Selected publications
Journal of Industrial and Engineering Chemistry (1914) vol. 6(3) pp. 233–237: A new viscometer for general scientific and technical purposes
Journal of Physical Chemistry (1914) vol. 18(2) pp. 157–165: The Viscosity of Binary Mixtures
Fluidity and Plasticity (1922) McGraw-Hill (Internet Digital Archive)
Journal of Physical Chemistry (1925) vol. 29(10) pp. 1201–1204: Plasticity
Review of Scientific Instruments (1933) vol. 4 p. 473: The New Science of Rheology
Journal of General Physiology (1944) vol. 28 pp. 79–94, pp. 131–149 [Bingham and Roepke], (1945) vol. 28 pp. 605–626: The Rheology of Blood

References

External links
Photograph of E. C. Bingham – Lafayette University Historical Photograph Collection

1878 births
1945 deaths
People from Cornwall, Vermont
American chemists
Rheologists
Fluid mechanics
Fluid dynamicists
Lafayette College faculty